Edmond Baird (9 July 1802 – 22 February 1859) was a cabinet-maker and upholsterer and achieved recognition as one of the best in Canada and, as such, promoting and fostering the growth of that industry within the country.

Edmund was born and trained in Scotland and came to Montreal where he quickly gained recognition as part of a partnership with John Hilton.

External links
 

1802 births
1859 deaths
Pre-Confederation Canadian businesspeople
Businesspeople from Montreal
Canadian cabinetmakers
Canadian Methodists
Anglophone Quebec people
Scottish emigrants to pre-Confederation Quebec